The Church of St. John the Baptist, East Markham is a parish church in the Church of England in East Markham, Nottinghamshire.

The church is Grade I listed by the Department for Digital, Culture, Media and Sport as a building of outstanding architectural or historic interest.

History

The church is medieval and was restored between 1883 and 1887 by John Oldrid Scott.

The East window is by Ninian Comper.

Parish structure
The church is in a group of parishes which includes
St. Nicholas' Church, Askham
St. Helen's Church, Grove
Church of St. John the Baptist, East Markham
St. Peter's Church, Headon-cum-Upton

Sources

East Markham
East Markham